The 1849 Massachusetts gubernatorial election was held on November 12, 1849.

Incumbent Whig Governor George N. Briggs defeated Democratic nominee George S. Boutwell and Free Soil nominee Stephen C. Phillips.

Since no candidate received a majority in the popular vote, Briggs was elected by the Massachusetts General Court per the state constitution.

General election

Candidates
George N. Briggs, Whig, incumbent Governor
George S. Boutwell, Democratic, state banking commissioner, former State Representative
Stephen C. Phillips, Free Soil, former U.S. Representative, former Mayor ofSalem, Massachusetts

Results

Legislative election
As no candidate received a majority of the vote, the Massachusetts General Court was required to decide the election. Under Article III of the Constitution of Massachusetts, the House of Representatives chose two candidates from the top four vote-getters, the Senate electing the Governor from the House's choice.

Contemporary sources only record the House's vote as Briggs 157, Phillips 63, Boutwell 59, which would result in the nomination of Briggs but not Boutwell.

The legislative election was held on January 7, 1850.

References

1849
Massachusetts
Gubernatorial